The Dalian Mosque is a mosque in Xigang District, Dalian, Liaoning, China. It is located at 96 Beijing Jie. Construction began in 1922, and was completed in 1925. The ahong of the mosque, Hajji Bai Yunxing, has served as ahong since 1958, with the exception of the period during the Cultural Revolution until 1979 when the mosque did not operate. , it was one of ten mosques in the city of Dalian.

Transportation
The mosque is accessible within walking distance southeast of Xianglujiao Station of Dalian Metro.

See also
 List of mosques in China
 Islam in China

References

1925 establishments in China
Buildings and structures in Dalian
Mosques completed in 1925
Mosques in China
Islamic organizations established in 1922